Hopperkopf is a mountain of Landkreis Waldeck-Frankenberg, Hesse, Germany.

Mountains of Hesse
Mountains and hills of the Rothaar